Roman Żuliński (28 January 1837 – 5 August 1864) - a Polish mathematician and co-commander of the January Uprising.

After the uprising he was sentenced to death  and hanged near the Warsaw Citadel on 5 August 1864, together with other rebel commanders, including Romuald Traugutt.

References

Polish people executed by the Russian Empire
1837 births
1864 deaths
January Uprising participants
Members of Polish government (January Uprising)
Executed Polish people
People executed by the Russian Empire by hanging